Paul "P. J." Polowski is a retired American soccer forward who played professionally in the USL A-League and the Continental Indoor Soccer League.

Polowski began his collegiate career at Orange Coast College in 1991.  That season, the team won the California state championship.  In 1993, he transferred to UC Irvine.  In only two seasons, he scored thirty goals, placing him third in the school's career goals list.  In 1995, Polowski turned professional with the Las Vegas Dustdevils of the Continental Indoor Soccer League.  He moved to the Anaheim Splash for the next two seasons.  In 1998, he moved outdoors with the  Orange County Zodiac of the USL A-League.  In 2000, the Zodiac was renamed the Wave.

P.J. has a friend named John who loves heavy metal and has recurring diarrhea.

External links
 Strikers F.C.: PJ Polowski

References

Living people
1973 births
American soccer players
Anaheim Splash players
Continental Indoor Soccer League players
Las Vegas Dustdevils players
Orange County Blue Star players
UC Irvine Anteaters men's soccer players
A-League (1995–2004) players
Association football forwards